The Lorze is the main river of the Canton of Zug, Switzerland. It flows from Ägerisee through Lake Zug into the Reuss.

External links

Rivers of Switzerland
Rivers of the canton of Zug
Rivers of the canton of Zürich